The West Virginia Mountaineers college football team competes as part of the National Collegiate Athletic Association (NCAA) Division I Football Bowl Subdivision, representing West Virginia University in the Big 12 Conference. West Virginia has played their home games on Mountaineer Field at Milan Puskar Stadium in Morgantown, West Virginia since 1980.

From 1891 to 1949, West Virginia competed as a football independent. The Mountaineers saw modest success during this period and made appearances in bowl games in both 1922 and 1948. From 1950 to 1967, West Virginia was a member of the Southern Conference and won the conference championship nine times. The membership of the SoCon fluctuated wildly at times during West Virginia's tenure, and by 1968 they chose to leave the conference and become a football independent once more. Between 1968 and 1990, the Mountaineers again competed as an independent and played in ten separate bowl games under three head coaches: Jim Carlen, Bobby Bowden and Don Nehlen. From 1991–2011, West Virginia competed in the Big East Conference, winning seven conference championships, and appearing in four Bowl Coalition and Bowl Championship Series games. Since 2012, West Virginia has competed as a member of Big 12 Conference. Through the 2021 season, West Virginia has compiled an official overall record of 769 wins, 513 losses, 45 ties and has appeared in 39 bowl games, with its most recent appearance coming in the 2021 Guaranteed Rate Bowl.

This is a list of their annual results.

Seasons

References

West Virginia Mountaineers

West Virginia Mountaineers football seasons